The 1997 World Weightlifting Championships were held in Chiang Mai, Thailand from December 6 to December 14. The men's competition in the 64 kg division was staged on 8 December 1997.

Medalists

Records

Results

References
Weightlifting World Championships Seniors Statistics, Page 8 

1997 World Weightlifting Championships